Nachtrit (English Night Run or Night Ride) is a 2006 Netherlands thriller film about the tribulations of an Amsterdam taxi-driver, played by Frank Lammers. The context is a vicious taxi war that was waged between two competing taxi companies in the city around 2000. We follow Dennis's daily life as he struggles to keep himself and his family afloat in an environment of treachery and ruthless savagery. The harder he fights, the deeper he gets into trouble, and the fewer options remain to him.

Cast  
 Frank Lammers as Dennis van der Horst 
 Fedja van Huêt as Marco van der Horst 
 Peggy Jane de Schepper as Elize van der Horst 
 Zita the Quay as Maxje 
 Muhammad Chaara as Mahmoud 
 Henk Poort as Uncle Jan Bremer 
 Hans Kesting as Joris 
 Fred Schrijber as Ruud 
 Bob Schrijber as Cees 
 Jeroen Willems as Joop Schroeder 
 Jaap Spijkers as Grimbergen 
 Yorick van Wageningen as Taxi-driver 
 Theo Maassen as Passenger 
 Caro Lenssen as Passenger

Reception
Nachtrit premiered on 30 September 2006 at the Dutch Film Festival in Utrecht. It was nominated for four Golden Calves—for best actor (won by Lammers), best supporting actor (won by van Huêt), best film, and best supporting actress. Dutch film journalists voted it the best Dutch film of 2006. In 2007, Lammers was nominated for a Rembrandt Award (best Dutch actor).

References

External links
 
 Night Run at SBS Film

2006 films
2000s Dutch-language films
2006 thriller films
Dutch thriller films